

England

Head Coach: Clive Woodward

 Garath Archer
 Neil Back
 Iain Balshaw
 Mike Catt
 Ben Cohen
 Martin Corry
 Lawrence Dallaglio
 Matt Dawson (c.)
 Darren Garforth
 Andy Gomarsall
 Phil Greening
 Austin Healey
 Richard Hill
 Alex King
 Jason Leonard
 Neil McCarthy
 Matt Perry
 Simon Shaw
 Mike Tindall
 Phil Vickery
 Jonny Wilkinson
 Trevor Woodman
 Joe Worsley

France

Head Coach: Bernard Laporte

 Franck Belot
 Abdelatif Benazzi
 Philippe Bernat-Salles
 Serge Betsen
 David Bory
 Olivier Brouzet
 Christian Califano
 Thomas Castaignède
 Sébastien Chabal
 Arnaud Costes
 Marc Dal Maso
 Jean Daude
 Pieter de Villiers
 Cédric Desbrosse
 Christophe Dominici
 Richard Dourthe
 Jean-Baptiste Élissalde
 Fabien Galthié
 Stéphane Glas
 Cédric Heymans
 Aubin Hueber
 Raphaël Ibañez
 Christophe Lamaison
 Christophe Laussucq
 Thomas Lièvremont
 Thomas Lombard
 Olivier Magne
 Lionel Mallier
 Legi Matiu
 Gérald Merceron
 Hugues Miorin
 Émile Ntamack
 Fabien Pelous (c.)
 Alain Penaud
 Franck Tournaire
 David Venditti

Ireland

Head Coach: Warren Gatland

 Justin Bishop
 Trevor Brennan
 Bob Casey
 Peter Clohessy
 Jeremy Davidson
 Kieron Dawson
 Girvan Dempsey
 Guy Easterby
 Simon Easterby
 Eric Elwood
 Justin Fitzpatrick
 Anthony Foley
 Mick Galwey
 John Hayes
 Rob Henderson
 Denis Hickie
 Shane Horgan
 David Humphreys
 Paddy Johns
 Kevin Maggs
 Michael Mullins
 Dion O'Cuinneagain
 Brian O'Driscoll
 Ronan O'Gara
 Malcolm O'Kelly
 Conor O'Shea
 Frankie Sheahan
 Peter Stringer
 Tom Tierney
 Paul Wallace
 Andy Ward
 Keith Wood (c.)

Italy

Head Coach: Brad Johnstone

 Orazio Arancio
 Mauro Bergamasco
 Carlo Checchinato
 Walter Cristofoletto
 Massimo Cuttitta
 Denis Dallan
 Manuel Dallan
 Giampiero de Carli
 Andrea De Rossi
 Diego Dominguez
 Juan Sebastian Francesio
 Massimo Giovanelli
 Andrea Gritti
 Giuseppe Lanzi
 Andrea Lo Cicero
 Luca Martin
 Matteo Mazzantini
 Giampiero Mazzi
 Nicola Mazzucato
 Alessandro Moreno
 Alessandro Moscardi
 Carlo Orlandi
 Tino Paoletti
 Aaron Persico
 Salvatore Perugini
 Corrado Pilat
 Matt Pini
 Giacomo Preo
 Marco Rivaro
 Andrea Scanavacca
 Cristian Stoica
 Laurent Travini
 Alessandro Troncon (c.)
 Wilhelmus Visser
 Nick Zisti

Scotland

Head Coach: Ian McGeechan

 Graeme Beveridge
 Steve Brotherstone
 Alan Bulloch
 Gordon Bulloch
 George Graham
 Stuart Grimes
 David Hilton
 Duncan Hodge
 John Leslie (c.)*
 Martin Leslie
 Kenny Logan
 Shaun Longstaff
 Cameron Mather
 Jamie Mayer
 Gordon McIlwham
 James McLaren
 Glenn Metcalfe
 Richard Metcalfe
 Craig Moir
 Scott Murray
 Andy Nicol
 Chris Paterson
 Budge Pountney
 Bryan Redpath (c.)**
 Stuart Reid
 Robbie Russell
 Steve Scott
 Graham Shiel
 Gordon Simpson
 Tom Smith
 Mattie Stewart
 Gregor Townsend
 Doddie Weir
 Jason White

*captain in the first, third and fourth games

**captain in the second and fifth games

Wales

Head Coach: Graham Henry

 Allan Bateman
 Nathan Budgett
 Matthew Cardey
 Colin Charvis
 Scott Gibbs
 Ian Gough
 Shane Howarth
 Rob Howley
 Dafydd James
 Garin Jenkins
 Neil Jenkins
 Spencer John
 Stephen Jones
 Jason Jones-Hughes
 Emyr Lewis
 Geraint Lewis
 Robin McBryde
 Rupert Moon
 Andy Moore
 Alix Popham
 Craig Quinnell
 Scott Quinnell
 Peter Rogers
 Brett Sinkinson
 Richard Smith
 Mark Taylor
 Gareth Thomas
 Mike Voyle
 Barry Williams
 Martyn Williams
 Rhys Williams
 Shane Williams
 Chris Wyatt
 Dai Young (c.)

External links

squads
Six Nations Championship squads